FAW Bus and Coach is a bus manufacturer located in Wuxi, Jiangsu, China.  Founded in 1959, it was assigned under the FAW Group in 1986.  The buses are sold under the Taihu brand.

The Dalian division of FAW Bus and Coach Co Ltd manufactures Jie Fang and Yuan Zheng brand medium and large-size buses in a 186,300-square-meter factory in Dalian, Liaoning, China. An unfinished bus production base at the Dalian Economic & Technological Development Zone is expected to be completed in mid-2010 and will produce hybrid buses.

Models
Taihu CA6100S1H2
Taihu CA6100S2H2
Taihu CA6122CH2
Taihu XQ6102SH2
Taihu XQ6103Y1H2
Taihu XQ6104S
Taihu XQ6113Y1H2
Taihu XQ6123Y1H2
Taihu XQ6600TQ9
Taihu XQ6601TQ9
Taihu XQ6609TQ2
Taihu XQ6739SH2
Taihu XQ6761SH9
Taihu XQ6769SH2
Taihu XQ6791YH2
Taihu XQ6820S1H2
Taihu XQ6861YH2
Taihu XQ6890SH2
Taihu XQ6890S1H2
Taihu XQ6961T1

References

External links
FAW Bus and Coach webpage

Bus manufacturers of China
FAW Group divisions and subsidiaries
Vehicle manufacturing companies established in 1959
Chinese companies established in 1959
Companies based in Wuxi